In optics, the exit pupil is a virtual aperture in an optical system. Only rays which pass through this virtual aperture can exit the system. The exit pupil is the image of the aperture stop in the optics that follow it. In a telescope or compound microscope, this image is the image of the objective element(s) as produced by the eyepiece. The size and shape of this disc is crucial to the instrument's performance, because the observer's eye can see light only if it passes through this tiny aperture. The term exit pupil is also sometimes used to refer to the diameter of the virtual aperture. Older literature on optics sometimes refers to the exit pupil as the Ramsden disc, named after English instrument-maker Jesse Ramsden.

Visual instruments

To use an optical instrument, the entrance pupil of the viewer's eye must be aligned with and be of similar size to the instrument's exit pupil. This properly couples the optical system to the eye and avoids vignetting. (The entrance pupil of the eye is the image of the anatomical pupil as seen through the cornea.) The location of the exit pupil thus determines the eye relief of an eyepiece. Good eyepiece designs produce an exit pupil of diameter approximating the eye's apparent pupil diameter, and located about 20 mm away from the last surface of the eyepiece for the viewer's comfort. If the disc is larger than the eye's pupil, light will be lost instead of entering the eye. If the disc is too close to the last surface of the eyepiece, the eye will have to be uncomfortably close for viewing; if too far away, the observer will have difficulty maintaining the eye's alignment with the disc.

Since the eye's pupil varies in diameter with viewing conditions, the ideal exit pupil diameter depends on the application. An astronomical telescope requires a large pupil because it is designed to be used for looking at dim objects at night, while a microscope will require a much smaller pupil since the object will be brightly illuminated. A set of 7×50 binoculars has an exit pupil just over 7.14 mm, which corresponds to the average pupil size of a youthful dark-adapted human eye in circumstances with no extraneous light. The emergent light at the eyepiece then fills the eye's pupil, meaning no loss of brightness at night due to using such binoculars (assuming perfect transmission). In daylight, when the eye's pupil is only 4 mm in diameter, over half the light will be blocked by the iris and will not reach the retina. However, the loss of light in the daytime is generally not a concern since there is so much light to start with. By contrast, 8×30 binoculars, often sold with emphasis on their compactness, have an exit pupil of only 3.75 mm. That is sufficient to fill a typical daytime eye pupil, making these binoculars better suited to daytime than night-time use. The maximum pupil size of a human eye is typically 5–9 mm for individuals below 25 years old, and decreases slowly with age as shown as an approximate guide in the table below.

The optimum eye relief distance also varies with application. For example, a rifle scope needs a very long eye relief to prevent recoil from causing it to strike the observer.

The exit pupil can be visualized by focusing the instrument on a bright, nondescript field, and holding a white card up to the eyepiece. This projects a disc of light onto the card. By moving the card closer to or further away from the eyepiece, the disc of light will be minimized when the card is at the exit pupil, and the bright disc then shows the diameter of the pupil. A clear vial of milky fluid can also be used to visualize the light rays, which appear as an hourglass shape converging and diverging as they exit the eyepiece, with the smallest cross-section (the waist of the hourglass shape) representing the exit pupil.

Telescopes

For a telescope, the diameter of the exit pupil can be calculated by dividing the focal length of the eyepiece by the focal ratio (f-number) of the telescope. In all but the cheapest telescopes, the eyepieces are interchangeable, and for this reason, the magnification is not written on the scope, as it will change with different eyepieces. Instead, the f-number f=L/D of the telescope is typically written on the scope, as well as the objective diameter D and focal length L. The individual eyepieces have their focal lengths written on them as well.

In the case of binoculars however, the two eyepieces are usually permanently attached, and the magnification and objective diameter (in mm) is typically written on the binoculars in the form, e.g., 7×50. In that case, the exit pupil can be easily calculated as the diameter of the objective lens divided by the magnification. The two formulas are of course equivalent and it is simply a matter of which information one starts with as to which formula to use.

Photography

The distance of the exit pupil from the sensor plane determines the range of angles of incidence that light will make with the sensor. Digital image sensors often have a limited range of angles over which they will efficiently accept light, especially those that use microlenses to increase their sensitivity. The closer the exit pupil to the focal plane, the higher the angles of incidence at the extreme edges of the field. This can lead to pixel vignetting. For this reason, many small digital cameras (such as those found in cell phones) are image-space telecentric.

See also
 Transmittance
 Diaphragm (optics)
 Pupil magnification

References

External links
A short definition of relative brightness

Optics
Science of photography

nl:Intree- en uittreepupil